Bujoreni is a commune in Teleorman County, Muntenia, Romania. It is composed of three villages: Bujoreni, Dărvaș and Prunaru.  
The last one of these villages was the site of the Battle of Prunaru 
during the Romanian Campaign of World War I.

References

Communes in Teleorman County
Localities in Muntenia